Madhavrao Bhawat High School (MBHS) is a co-educational school located in Vile Parle, a suburb of Mumbai, India. Mr. Anup Ved has been a notable alumni of this school.

High schools and secondary schools in Mumbai
Educational institutions established in 1952
1952 establishments in Bombay State